Loafing and Camouflage: Sirens at Land is a 2011 film and the third to bear the "Loafing & Camo" stamp. It is the only in the series which is not military-themed. The film stars the cast of previous film Loafing and Camouflage: Sirens in the Aegean 8 years later.

Plot
After the mysterious kidnapping of Noori, a 12-year-old orphan Pakistani protégée, from Crete, Stavromathiakakis follows her traces. The traces lead him to the capital of Athens, during the 2011 anti-austerity protests.

Parlavatzas has opened a restaurant chain company called "Sevdali" with Papadakis as his chef. Nakos is a hacktivist and also participates in a gang of "Super Market Robin Hoods". Kalouris who is now a new member of the city council struggles to upgrade the city's cultural profile. Tsibitzidis has become a motivational speaker "guru" giving self -esteem lessons to his supporters and to the Ministry's Council part of which is his "ex" and Vice Minister Marialena.

Cast
Yannis Tsimitselis	 .... 	Tzibitzidis
George Seitaridis	.... 	Parlavatzas
Ioannis Papazisis	.... 	Kalouris
Orfeas Avgoustidis	.... 	Stavrakomathiakakis
Socratis Patsikas	.... 	Nakos
Stelios Ksanthoudakis	.... 	Papadakis
Renos Haralambidis	.... 	Makris
Vicky Kaya	.... 	Marialena
Tzeni Theona
Eleftheria Komi
Despoina Mavroeidi
Rasmi Soukouli

External links

2011 films
Greek satirical films
Films directed by Nikos Perakis
Films set in Athens
Films set in 2011
Films set in the Great Recession
Films shot in Greece